Spirits Known and Unknown , subtitled New Vocal Frontiers, is the debut album by American jazz vocalist and percussionist Leon Thomas recorded in 1969 and released by the Flying Dutchman label.

Reception

AllMusic reviewer Thom Jurek stated: "Leon Thomas' debut solo recording after his tenure with Pharoah Sanders is a fine one.  ... Thomas' patented yodel is in fine shape here, displayed alongside his singular lyric style and scat singing trademark... Ultimately, this is among Thomas' finest moments on vinyl, proving his versatility and accessibility to an audience who, for too long already, had associated him too closely with the avant-garde and free jazz". Critic Robert Christgau said "The subtitle, "New Vocal Frontiers," is accurate. Thomas is the only really interesting jazz singer to have appeared in a very long time. He even yodels".

Track listing
All compositions by Leon Thomas except where noted
 "The Creator Has a Master Plan (Peace)" (Thomas, Pharoah Sanders) − 4:23
 "One" − 3:07
 "Echoes" − 5:38
 "Song for My Father" (Horace Silver) − 5:17
 "Damn Nam (Ain't Goin' to Vietnam)" − 4:42
 "Malcolm's Gone" (Thomas, Sanders) − 	8:35
 "Let the Rain Fall On Me" (Aaron Bell, Carla Huston) − 5:24

Personnel
Leon Thomas − vocals, percussion
James Spaulding − alto saxophone
Little Rock (pseudonym for Pharoah Sanders) - tenor saxophone
Lonnie Liston Smith - piano
Cecil McBee, Richard Davis - bass
Roy Haynes - drums 
Richard Landrum − bongos

References

Leon Thomas albums
1970 albums
Flying Dutchman Records albums
Albums produced by Bob Thiele